Oluf (Olaus) Gerhard Tychsen (14 December 1734, Tønder, then Schleswig, now Denmark – 30 December 1815, Rostock, then Mecklenburg-Schwerin, now Germany) was a German Orientalist and Hebrew scholar. He is known today as one of the founding fathers of Islamic numismatics.

As a Lutheran Christian, he attended the Christianeum grammar school in Altona, then Holstein and the rabbinic school attached to the Altona Ashkenazi synagogue, led by Jonathan Eybeschütz, chief rabbi of the Triple Community of Altona-Hamburg-Wandsbek. From 1756 he studied Oriental languages at the University of Halle.

He spent a year of missionary work towards the conversion of Jews, and then taught Hebrew in the newly founded University of Bützow. He held librarian and academic positions in Bützow. There he founded the Journal Bützower Nebenstunden, which comprised a broad variety of articles about the Old Testament and Oriental Culture, especially material culture, such as Islamic coins.

From 1778 he taught at the University of Rostock and led the Rostock University Library. He worked in different fields of Oriental studies, Arabic, Syriac, and Hebrew. His Introduction into Islamic Numismatics, in 1794, was the first scientific handbook on this topic, based on twenty-seven years of research. Among his students were Christian Martin Frähn, later professor at the University of Kazan and later founder of the Asiatic Museum in Saint Petersburg, and Christian Adler, who wrote the first scientific catalogue of a collection of Islamic coins and later became superintendent for Schleswig-Holstein. He was a prolific author who published some forty volumes of scholarly studies during his academic career. He received the title of Chaver, a grade of rabbinic ordination, from Eybeschütz, becoming the only known non-Jew to have done so.

Memberships
 since 1791: Royal Society of Sciences in Uppsala
 since 1792: Accadenia Letteraria Volsca Veliterna (Società letteraria dei Volsci), Velletri
 since 1793: Royal Swedish Academy of Letters, History and Antiquities, Stockholm
 since 1796: Galileiana Academy of Arts and Science, Padua (corresponding)
 since 1798: Royal Danish Academy of Sciences and Letters
 since 1801: Mecklenburgian Society for Nature Research, Rostock
 since 1803: Royal Prussian Society of Sciences, Berlin
 since 1813: Royal Bavarian Academy of Sciences, Munich (corresponding)
 since 1815: Historical-Philological Class (department), University of Kazan (honorary corresponding)

References
 Niklot Klüßendorf: "Das akademische Münzkabinett der Universität Rostock (1794–1944)." In: Werner Buchholz, Günter Mangelsdorf (eds.): Land am Meer, Pommern im Spiegel seiner Geschichte, Roderich Schmidt zum 70. Geburtstag, Köln et al. 1995, pp. 725–757.
 Stefan Heidemann: "Die Entwicklung der Methoden in der Islamischen Numismatik im 18. Jahrhundert – War Johann Jacob Reiske ihr Begründer?" In: Hans-Georg Ebert, Thoralf Hanstein (edd.): Johann Jacob Reiske: Persönlichkeit und Wirkung, Leipzig 2005 (= Beiträge zur Leipziger Universitäts- und Wissenschaftsgeschichte 7), pp. 147–202.
 Shnayer Z. Leiman, the Seforim blog, November 16, 2006.

1734 births
1815 deaths
People from Tønder Municipality
People from the Duchy of Schleswig
German orientalists
German numismatists
18th-century German Protestant theologians
Christian Hebraists
University of Halle alumni
University of Bützow alumni
Academic staff of the University of Rostock
German male non-fiction writers
Danish Lutherans
German Lutherans
Members of the Royal Danish Academy of Sciences and Letters
Members of the Prussian Academy of Sciences
Members of the Bavarian Academy of Sciences
Kazan Federal University